is a combination arcade game and collectible card game featuring the characters of the Super Sentai Series. Like Bandai's previous Cardass video game Kamen Rider Battle: Ganbaride, the game is a tie in with TV Asahi and Toei Company's television series. Its promotion began with the promotion for the film Samurai Sentai Shinkenger vs. Go-onger: GinmakuBang!! and it is tied directly into the 2010 Super Sentai television series Tensou Sentai Goseiger. In 2011, the game  was released, tying it in with Gokaiger. In 2014, the game  was released, tying it in with ToQger.

See also
Kamen Rider Battle: Ganbaride

External links
Official website

2010 video games
Digital collectible card games
Card games introduced in 2010
Arcade video games
Arcade-only video games
Japan-exclusive video games
Super Sentai
Tokusatsu video games
Multiplayer and single-player video games
Video games developed in Japan